Sylvain Guintoli (born 24 June 1982 in Montélimar) is a French professional motorcycle racer. He was FIM World Superbike Champion in 2014. He is contracted to the Suzuki MotoGP team as a test rider with occasional race entries, as a wild card or replacement rider.

In 2017, he competed in the British Superbike Championship with the new Suzuki GSX-R1000. He spent the early years of his career in 250cc Grand-Prix World Championship on private bikes. He was a 500cc 2 stroke test rider for Yamaha and made a single MotoGP start in 2002. Best MotoGP rookie in 2007 for Yamaha, he raced for Ducati MotoGP in 2008. After a serious leg injury in 2009, he recovered and became World Superbike Champion in 2014 for Aprilia. In 2021 he was the winner of the 24 Hours of Le Mans endurance race on Suzuki together with Xavier Simeon and Gregg Black, followed by the Bol d'Or and finally the Championship. In 2022, he suffered a wrist injury preventing his entry into the Suzuka 8 Hours race and also as a replacement for Joan Mir in MotoGP.

Career

250cc & MotoGP World Championship

2000
Guintoli made his grand prix debut in the 250cc class for the Équipe du France, partnering Julian da Costa for the French GP, with a Honda. He qualified 24th out of 33 riders, two second and a half faster than da Costa, 32nd. He retired during the first few laps with a mechanical issue.

2001
Guintoli joined the French team Équipe du France - Scrab GP with fellow Frenchman Randy de Puniet in 250 Grand-Prix. He finished 14th in the 250 World Championship with 44 points. His best result was a 4th place at the Dutch grand prix. He raced an Aprilia 250.

2002
For the 2002 season, Guintoli became the test driver for the Yamaha team, so he did not raced full-time that year. He raced his first MotoGP race at the Czech race for the French Yamaha Tech 3 team, having qualified 21st and finished 17th. This was his last race of the year, as he returned to his test drive position until the end of the year.

2003
For the 2003 season, Guintoli returned to the 250cc class, racing for the Campetella Racing, riding a private Aprilia, partnering Italian Franco Battaini. He showed some good pace, fighting consistently for midpoints scoring positions.

He finished his first race of the year, at Suzuka in 9th place.

He started to get more competitive with a 6th and a 5th place at Mugello and Le Mans respectively. He even scored his first podium at Assen, finishing third in wet conditions, not far behind than race-winner Anthony West and Franco Battaini, both in Aprilias. He then scored some other strong points, finishing in fourth place twice, at the Rio GP and at Valencia.

He finished the year in 10th place with 104 points.

2004
For the 2004 season, Guintoli remained with Campetella Racing, riding again on a private 250  Aprilia. He was partnered again by Franco Battaini and this time also by Joan Olivé. This year the team struggled and none of them scored podiums.

Guintoli finished the year in 14th place with 42 points, his best result being a 7th place at Barcelona. Battaini finished in front of the Frenchman in 10th place with 93 points and Olivé behind in 19th place with 27 points.

2005
For the 2005 season, Guintoli returned to the Équipe du France GP Scrab, partnered first by Grégory Leblanc and then by Mathieu Gines, both French. He once again rode an Aprilia 250.

Nothing changed from last year, with Guintoli again finishing in midpoints scoring positions. He finished the season in 10th place, with 84 points. He outpaced his two teammates, with Leblanc who scored 6 points and Gines none.

2006
He was confirmed by the French team Equipe du France GP Scrab also for 2006, with rookie Jules Cluzel as his partner. Guintoli finished the year in ninth position, scoring 96 points, with Cluzel 20th.

Return to MotoGP

2007
After having several years in the 250 cc class, he raced in the MotoGP class for the Tech 3 Yamaha team in 2007. He described the opportunity as a "dream come true", but suffered a setback early in testing when he crashed and broke his collarbone, eliminating him from testing for several weeks. The Tech 3 team was one of the backmarkers and Guintoli has scored solid lower-order points in 2007, always qualifying in front of his teammate Makoto Tamada and the Kawasakis. He shone in damp conditions at Le Mans, briefly leading before falling, but rejoining to finish 10th. He finished 4th at the Motegi GP, making this his best MotoGP finish, and Dunlop's best finish on an 800cc bike. There were further regular lower-point finishes in 2007. He finished the season in sixteenth place, with 50 points, against Tamada's 38.

2008

He was officially snapped up by Luis d'Antin, to ride the Ducati Desmocedici in 2008 for Pramac d'Antin, now renamed as Alice Team (replacing Alex Hofmann), on Saturday 15 September. Guintoli had an average 2008 finishing 13th in the championship, with his best finish being a 6th in the German Grand Prix. At the end of the season Alice Team did not renew Guintoli's contract and with no other seats free he was forced to leave MotoGP to find a ride.

British Superbike Championship

2009
Guintoli then took a step down to the British Superbike Championship for the 2009 season, riding for the Worx Crescent Suzuki team as their sole rider.
Guintoli started his debut season in the British Superbike Championship impressively with a 1st and 2nd at the Brands Hatch Indy circuit. However, during the buildup to race 5 of the championship at Donington Park, Guintoli was involved in a collision with Josh Brookes. The incident left Guintoli with a broken tibia and fibula in his right leg, with him expected to miss several rounds He finished the season in 8th place, with 166 points, having scored one win and three further podiums in his first four races.

2017
In 2017, Guintoli returned to the British Superbike Championship riding a Suzuki. He skipped two rounds mid-season, having re-joined part-time the MotoGP class after six years to replace the injured Alex Rins, again for Suzuki.

With three rounds to go, he is currently classified on 15th position, with 79 points. He is the best Suzuki rider. His best result is a 4th place at the opening race at Silverstone on 10 September.

Superbike World Championship

After finishing the British Superbike Championship season with three fifth places at Oulton Park, Guintoli was signed up for another season with the Worx Crescent Suzuki squad. But when Max Neukirchner suddenly left Suzuki to join Honda, Guintoli was drafted in as his replacement for the 2010 season. Guintoli then rode the final World Superbike Championship round of the 2009 season in Portimão finishing tenth in the second race. He was competitive at the opening round, but was disappointed with his own performance at round two in Portugal, where he took a best finish of ninth on a bike that teammate Leon Haslam rode to a victory. He did not finish as high as fourth again until round nine, but had scored points in every race at this stage.
For 2011, Guintoli has signed with Liberty Cz Group-backed Liberty Ducati, based in Prague, Czech Republic. His teammate will be WSBK veteran and former Guandalini Ducati/Aprilia rider Jakub Smrz. In 2012, Guintoli achieved his and the team's first win at the third round of the season, in Assen. He will top the podium twice again over the course of the season, first at Silverstone and then in the home-round at Magny Cours. He joined the Aprilia factory team in 2013 as a replacement for Max Biaggi, taking one win and finishing third overall in the Championship behind Tom Sykes and Eugene Laverty. He retained his seat for the 2014 Superbike World Championship season, and started the season on a high note by winning Race 2 in the opening round at Phillip Island. Four more wins will follow during the course of the season, culminating in his championship-winning double win at the closing round in Losail. Guintoli is the first French World Superbike champion since Raymond Roche in 1990. For the 2015 Superbike World Championship season, he joined Pata Honda World Superbike. He finished in front of his young Teammate Michael Van Der Mark in the Championship.

In 2016, he was hired by the new factory Yamaha World Superbike Team to ride the new R1. He suffered a brutal crash in Imola and broke several bones. He missed 10 races but came back to finish the season with a first podium for the squad in Doha, Qatar. He also ended the season in front of his teammate Alex Lowes.

Other championships

Endurance
Guintoli's first race in the World Endurance Championship was at the end of 2010. He rode for Suzuki SERT Team in the final round Doha, Qatar. They won the race and the 2010 World title following this result.

He also raced for the factory Suzuki Yoshimura Team in the Suzuka 8H in 2017 (7th), 2018 (10th) and 2019 (5th).

For the EWC 2021 season, Guintoli was part of the Championship-winning team with Gregg Black and Xavier Siméon riding for Yoshimura-Sert Suzuki.

Career statistics

All-time statistics

Grand Prix motorcycle racing

Races by year
(key) (Races in bold indicate pole position; races in italics indicate fastest lap)

British Superbike Championship

Races by year
(key)

Superbike World Championship

Races by year
(key) (Races in bold indicate pole position; races in italics indicate fastest lap)

References

External links

1982 births
Living people
People from Montélimar
Suzuki MotoGP riders
250cc World Championship riders
French motorcycle racers
British Superbike Championship riders
Superbike World Championship riders
French people of Italian descent
Tech3 MotoGP riders
Pramac Racing MotoGP riders
Sportspeople from Drôme
MotoGP World Championship riders